Qian Ying (14 May 1903 — 26 July 1973) was a Chinese politician who served as Minister of Supervision of the People's Republic of China from 1954 to 1959.

Life 
Qian Ying was born in Qianjiang County, Hubei. From 1923, she lived in Wuhan, where she studied at the Hubei Women's Normal School. She became a member of the Chinese Communist Party in 1927. From September 1954 to April 1959, she was Minister of Supervision of the People's Republic of China.
In 1972, during the Cultural Revolution, she was refused medical treatment and died in 1973 from lung cancer. She was rehabilitated in 1978.

She has been described as a "female Judge Bao" (女包公).

Notes

References

Sources 

1903 births
1973 deaths
Deaths from lung cancer
Chinese Communist Party politicians from Hubei
20th-century Chinese women politicians